HMS Farndale was a Type 2  destroyer of the Royal Navy which served in World War II. She was scrapped in 1962. She has been the only British Warship so far to bear this name.

Service history
Farndale was ordered on 4 September 1939 under the 1939 War Emergency Build Programme. She was completed in April 1941. She was adopted by the civil community of Southgate, then in Middlesex, as part of Warship Week in 1942.

She earned eleven battle honours for extensive service during the Second World War. This included service in the Mediterranean where she was severely damaged in February 1942, and resulted in extensive repairs in the UK that year. She then saw service with Russian convoys, followed by work to support the allied landings in Italy. Towards the end of the war she was nominated for service in the Far East in support of Operation Zipper for landings in Malaya, which was cancelled with the end of the War.

She returned to Sheerness from the Far East in November 1945 and was transferred to the Reserve Fleet. From 1946 until 1951 she was part of the Nore Local Flotilla and was then placed in reserve again at Hartlepool. She remained there until 1962 when she was sold to BISCO for scrapping by Hughes Bolckow. She arrived at their breakers yard in Blyth on 29 November 1962.

References

Publications
 
 

 

1940 ships
Ships built by Swan Hunter
Hunt-class destroyers of the Royal Navy